The NASA Exceptional Service Medal is an award granted to U.S. government employees for significant sustained performance characterized by unusual initiative or creative ability that clearly demonstrates substantial improvement in engineering, aeronautics, space flight, administration, support, or space-related endeavors which contribute to NASA programs.

The medal was inherited by NASA from its predecessor organization, the National Advisory Committee on Aeronautics (NACA) and  featured the NACA emblem. The original NASA version featured the NASA seal.

Notable recipients
Buzz Aldrin (1969)
Robert O. Aller (twice)
Neil Armstrong (1966)
Charles Bolden (thrice)
John R. Casani (1965)
Lin Chambers (2009)
Kevin Chilton
Eileen Collins (1998) 
Michael Collins (1966)
Nagin Cox
William H. Dana
Jean Dickey (1998)
John H. Disher (twice, last in 1980)
Einar Enevoldson (1974 and 1980)
Christer Fuglesang (2010)
Fitzhugh L. Fulton (1977 and 1983)
Alfred Gessow (1974)
Gus Grissom
John M. Grunsfeld (1997, 1998, and 2000)
Umberto Guidoni (2002)
Joseph Gutheinz (2000)
Chris Hadfield (2002)
Karl Heimburg (1969)
Joan E. Higginbotham
David M. Jones
Mark Kelly
Don Leslie Lind (1974)
James A. Lovell (with star)
Paul D. Lowman
William S. McArthur
Pamela Matson
Saverio "Sonny" Morea (twice)
James B. Odom (1973)
Robert J. Parks (1967)
Julie Payette (2010)
Arthur Rudolph
Tecwyn Roberts (1969)
Walter M. Schirra (1964 and 1968)
David Scott (1966)
Sigurd A. Sjoberg (1969)
Deke Slayton
Andrew J. Stofan (1975)
Epaminondas Stassinopoulos (1992)
Heidemarie Stefanyshyn-Piper
Richard H. Truly (two awards)
Peggy Whitson (1993, 2003, 2006, and 2008)
John W. Young (1965 and 1966)
 (2007).

See also 
Awards and decorations of the United States government
NASA Distinguished Service Medal

References

External links
 NASA awards
 National Aeronautics and Space Administration Honor Awards (1969-1978)

Exceptional Service Medal